Tricouni Peak is a mountain located south of Cypress Peak on the Squamish-Cheakamus divide within the Pacific Ranges of the Coast Mountains in southwestern British Columbia, Canada. It was named in 1931 by Tom Fyles et al., the first ascent party. According to Tom Fyles himself, "Tricouni Mountain was the name suggested for the peak, as from a distance it had the appearance of three cones". A misinterpreted "resemblance to a 3-pointed tricouni boot nail" was mentioned only much later, and not by Fyles. The name "Tricouni Peak" was adopted on 22 June 1967.

Climate

Based on the Köppen climate classification, Tricouni Peak is located in the marine west coast climate zone of western North America. Most weather fronts originate in the Pacific Ocean, and travel east toward the Coast Mountains where they are forced upward by the range (Orographic lift), causing them to drop their moisture in the form of rain or snowfall. As a result, the Coast Mountains experience high precipitation, especially during the winter months in the form of snowfall. Winter temperatures can drop below −20 °C with wind chill factors below −30 °C.

See also
 
 Geography of British Columbia

References

Two-thousanders of British Columbia
Pacific Ranges
New Westminster Land District